Sköld is a surname of Swedish origin. It directly translates to the English word "shield".   Sköld may refer to:

People
 Gunnar Sköld (1894–1971), Swedish road racing cyclist
 Hannes Sköld (1886–1930), Swedish socialist and anti-militarist
 Johan Sköld (born 1975), Swedish golfer
 Kristian Sköld (1911–1988), Swedish chess player
 Linus Sköld (born 1983), Swedish politician
 Martin Sköld (born 1970), Swedish musician, Kent
 Nils Sköld (1921–1996), Swedish Army lieutenant general
 Per Edvin Sköld (1891–1972), Swedish Social Democratic politician 
 Tim Sköld, Swedish musician
 Victor Sköld (born 1989), Swedish footballer
 Yngve Sköld (1899–1992), Swedish composer, pianist and organist

Other
Skold vs. KMFDM, album with Tim Skold and Sascha Konietzko of KMFDM
HSwMS Sköld, small river monitor built for the Swedish Royal Skerry Artillery in the late 1860s

See also
Skiöld
Skjold (disambiguation)
Skjöldr

Surnames
Swedish-language surnames